Sathasivan "Saths" Cooper (born 11 June 1950) is a clinical psychologist in South Africa who was born in Durban of Indian-South African background. He began to identify with the Black Consciousness Movement (BCM) and joined the South African Students' Organisation (SASO), and was one of the so-called "SASO Nine" student leaders arrested in 1974 for their anti-Apartheid activities. During this time Saths spent nine years banned, house arrested and jailed, including over five years in Robben Island where he shared a cell block with Nelson Mandela.

While imprisoned, Cooper completed his undergraduate degree in psychology via a correspondence course with the University of South Africa. Released in 1982 Cooper went on to study at the University of the Witwatersrand completing his PhD as a Fulbright scholar at Boston University. He was four times elected President of the Psychological Society of South Africa, and was Vice-Chancellor and Principal of the University of Durban-Westville (prior to its merger). He served as President of the International Congress of Psychology which was held in 2012 in Cape Town, South Africa. At the Congress, Cooper was elected the first African President of the International Union of Psychological Science (IUPsyS), a kind of United Nations for 90 national psychology organizations and over 20 regional organizations.

Background 
Cooper was born in a rural area outside Durban, South Africa where his parents ran a local school. He grew up understanding and using multiple languages including Zulu, Tamil, Afrikaans, Xhosa, and English. Cooper became politically active in high school and continued to be politically active throughout college, which may have resulted in his expulsion from the University College, Salisbury Island, Durban as well as the South African government denying him a passport to attend university in Britain. As a leader of the Natal Indian Congress, Cooper had frequent meetings with Steve Biko, the leader of the Black Consciousness Movement, and encouraged Indian activists to participate in this movement.

Contributions to Psychology 
Cooper's most significant contributions to psychology was to help South Africans heal from the trauma of apartheid, advance human rights, and support democracy. He also helped to create the Psychological Society of South Africa (PsySSA), which was South Africa's first psychology organization that did not discriminate based on race or gender.

Roles 
 Founding Secretary - Theatre Council of Natal (TECON)
 Founding Secretary - South African Black Theatre Union
 Co-Leader - 1972 national student boycott of the University of the North (with Steve Biko)
 Vice president, deputy, and president - Azanian People's Organization
 Founder - National Forum
 Founding trustee - Institute for Black Research
 President - South African/Azanian Student Movement, US
 Chair - Archbishop Tutu Scholarship Fund
 Co-Founder - Center for Health and Development, US
 Chair - Soweto Dance Theatre Company
 Chair - Operation Masakhane for the Homeless
 Participant - Alternate Dispute Resolution Association of South Africa
 Chair - South African Community Developmental Agency
 Chair - Conquest for Life
 Founding member - Goldstone Commission of Enquiry into Children's Rights
 Contributor - Robben Island Museum
 Contributor - Apartheid Museum
 Contributor - Nelson Mandela Gateway
 Founding publisher - Indigo (lifestyle magazine)
 Consult - Various radio and television programs
 Chair - Road Accident Fund
 Representative - IUPsyS

Honors 
 Fellow of the International Science Council
 Fellow of the British Psychological Society (2014).
 American Psychological Association Award for Distinguished Contributions to the International Advancement of Psychology (2014).
 Achievement Against The Odds Award from International Union of Psychological Science (2012).
 Medal for Services to International Psychology from International Union of Psychological Science (2008).
 Fellow of the National Academy of Psychology (India) (2007).
 Fellow of the Psychological Society of South Africa (2002).
 Fellow of the Irish Psychological Society.

References 

South African psychologists
Living people
1950 births
South African people of Indian descent
Fellows of the British Psychological Society
Apartheid in South Africa
South African theatre people
Black Consciousness Movement
People from Durban
South African anti-racism activists